The Osage Treaty (also known as the Treaty with the Osage) was signed in St. Louis, MO, on June 2, 1825 between William Clark on behalf of the United States and members of the Osage Nation. The accord contained fourteen articles. Based on the most important terms of the accord, the Osage ceded multiple territories to the United States government. According to the first article of the treaty, the territories ceded entailed lands lying within and west of both the State of Missouri and the Territory of Arkansas, lands lying north and west of the Red River, all territories south and east of the Kansas River, and all lands located through the Rock Saline. The accord was proclaimed on December 30, 1825.

See also
 Osage Treaty (disambiguation)
List of treaties

References

Sources
Oklahoma State University Library (Kappler Project: Indian Affairs: Laws and Treaties) - Treaty With The Osage, 1825

External links
Wikisource - Treaty With The Osage, 1825

United States and Native American treaties
1825 treaties